The St Croix (Saint 'Croy') is a breed of domestic sheep native to the U.S. Virgin Islands and named for the island of Saint Croix. They are often also called Virgin Island White because those that were imported into North America were selected for white coloration. On the Island of St. Croix, they come in shades of brown, white, and black.

The breed is believed to be descended from African sheep that were brought to the Caribbean on slave ships and is a breed of hair sheep which does not grow wool. The St Croix is a hardy tropical breed known for its parasite resistance, and is raised primarily for meat production.  Breeders have crossbred the St Croix with other breeds  to impart these important traits into their bloodlines.

Characteristics
Most St. Croix are completely white with others being solid tan, brown, black or white with brown or black spots. Ewes and rams are polled (no horns), and rams have a large throat ruff. Mature ewes weigh 68 kg (150 lbs) and rams weigh 90 kg (200 lbs). Birth weights average 2.7 kg (6 lbs) to 3.1 kg (7 lbs). Tail should not need docking.

Adaptability
St. Croix sheep can live in a wide variety of climates. They are well adapted to the hot humid climate of the tropics and can survive in cold temperatures. Their hair coat keeps them cool in warmer temperatures. They grow a thick wool coat in cold temperatures that they shed naturally as the weather warms up. Their coat also sheds water. These sheep are known as 'Parasitic Pasture Vacuums' for their ability to clear a pasture of parasites reducing the need to worm sheep. This trait can be beneficial in producing parasite resistant crosses with meatier carcasses than purebred St. Croix alone. In 2012, Langston University in Oklahoma began a three-year study which included a flock of Persimmon Creek St. Croix Dorper crosses that had not been wormed for several years and had been selectively culled for parasite resistance. This flock demonstrated very low fecal egg counts despite ingesting large amounts of eggs under study conditions.

St. Croix also show resistance to hoof rot. Due to their hair shedding ability, sheep should be fly strike resistant.

Reproductivity
Ewes and rams hit puberty just after 3 months old. Lambs should be separated from their mother after 60 days to prevent impregnation of the ewe. At the age of 7–8 months, ewe lambs should have their first estrus cycle. Ewes will ovulate during all months of the year, not following a seasonal breeding period like most sheep. Ewes can lamb at 12 months of age. Ewes can have two lamb crops in a year, sometimes three in two years. One to four lambs in one lamb crop are possible, with twins being most common. St. Croix sheep have a high lamb survivability and the ewes are instinctive mothers, usually not requiring much help. Ewes also produce plenty of milk for their lambs.

Milking
St. Croix ewes produce ample quantities of milk high in butterfat. In some regions of the United States, ewes are being milked for cheese production.

Carcass and Growth
Lambs finish with a minimal amount of fat and have a small bone to fat ratio. Meat is lean and without the tallow taste, as well as naturally low in cholesterol. Flavor and aroma is described as mild. Meat is judged as having good flavor, juiciness, and tenderness. Lambs have a slightly slower growing rate than most sheep breeds.

Temperament
St. Croix are easy to handle livestock. Sheep should be active without showing signs of being wild or flighty. Charging and head butting is a less common behavior in rams. Sheep tend to be comfortable around people. St. Croix have a good herding instinct and are often used to train herding dogs.

Other
St. Croix sheep are both grazers and browsers. They are not selective eaters. Sheep have been used for weed control due to their preference for weeds. St. Croix sheep are easily managed.

References

External links

St Croix Sheep Breeders Association
St Croix Hair Sheep International Association

Sheep breeds originating in the United States
Saint Croix, U.S. Virgin Islands
Sheep breeds